Irina Ivanivna Deriugina (born 11 January 1958) is a former Soviet individual rhythmic gymnast from Ukraine and Ukrainian coach in rhythmic gymnastics. She is the only Soviet rhythmic gymnast to win two all-around world titles, which she won in 1977 and 1979. Her mother, Albina, was her coach. Her success influenced the further development of rhythmic gymnastics in Kyiv.

Career 
Deriugina was born in a family of Ukrainian athletes from Eastern Ukraine, a female gymnast, Albina Deriugina, and a pentathlon athlete, Ivan Deriuhin. At age ten in 1968, Deriugina entered the National Ballet School. From 1976 to 1980 she was a student of the Kyiv National Institute of Physical Culture. Deriugina was a member of the Soviet rhythmic gymnastics squad from 1972 until her retirement from the sport in 1982. She was then appointed the Ukrainian national coach.

Deriugina was in charge of the RG technical organizing committee as competition director from 1988 to 1992. At her Kyiv school, she and her mother train forty high level gymnasts. Since 1992, they also organize an annual rhythmic tournament, the Deriugina Cup.

Deriugina was a judge at the 1988 Seoul and 1992 Barcelona Olympic Games. She was involved in a large judging scandal that took place at the 2000 European Championships in Zaragoza, Spain. Video was used to prove that she and five other judges, Natalia Stepanova (Belarus), Gabriele Stummer (Austria), Galina Marjina (Latvia), Ursula Sohlenkamp (Germany) and Natalia Lashtsinkaya (Russia), were guilty of discriminating against Olena Vitrychenko of Ukraine, in comparison to scores given to other gymnasts. In the end, the six guilty judges were suspended for one year and they were excluded from the judging course in Rome. For the 2000 Sydney Olympics, those countries had to choose another judge who met the requirements of the Fédération Internationale de Gymnastique. This was the first time in the sport's history that such massive inappropriate behaviour was documented and penalized.

Personal life 
Deriugina was married to Oleh Blokhin, a Ukrainian football striker and coach who was European Footballer of the Year in 1975. They have a daughter together named Iryna Blokhina, a pop artist socialite and as well as choreographing for the Deriugina's students.

External links

1958 births
Living people
Gymnasts from Kyiv
Ukrainian rhythmic gymnasts
Soviet rhythmic gymnasts
Deriugins Gymnasts
National University of Ukraine on Physical Education and Sport alumni
Ukrainian gymnastics coaches
Medalists at the Rhythmic Gymnastics World Championships